Kim Jong-Un Hamhŭng University of Chemical Industry is a university in Hamhung, North Korea. The first science and technology institute to be established in North Korea, it was established in 1947.

See also 
 List of universities in North Korea

References

Universities in North Korea
1947 establishments in Korea
Hamhung